Jean de Gisors (1133–1220) was a Norman lord of the fortress of Gisors in Normandy, where meetings were traditionally convened between English and French kings. It was here, in 1188, a squabble occurred that involved the cutting of an elm.

Initially he was a vassal of the king of England - Henry II and then Richard I. During this time he also owned property in Sussex and the manor of Titchfield in Hampshire in England. 

Some time between 1170 and 1180 he purchased the manor of Buckland, Hampshire from the de Port family.  On this newly purchased land he founded the town of Portsmouth as one end of a trade route between England and France. The original settlement of Portsmouth was a planned town on a medieval grid pattern, of which other examples can be found in places like Salisbury. Much of this original grid pattern is still visible in the Old Portsmouth district of Portsmouth. 

One of the first acts ordered by de Gisors in Portsmouth was the donation of land to the Augustinian canons of Southwick Priory so that they could build a chapel "to the glorious honour of the martyr Thomas of Canterbury, one time Archbishop, on (my) land which is called Sudewede, the island of Portsea", Thomas Becket having spent much time in Gisors. This foundation of the Church of St Thomas of Canterbury was to eventually become Portsmouth Cathedral.

However the royal patronage of de Gisors was not to last, as after his support for an unsuccessful rebellion in Normandy in 1193 he paid the price by forfeiting all his lands, including Portsmouth, to Richard I.

In popular culture
In conspiracy theories, such as the one promoted in The Holy Blood and the Holy Grail, Jean de Gisors has been alleged to be the first Grand Master of the Priory of Sion (1188–1220).

References

External links
The Founding of Portsmouth
Origins of Old Portsmouth

1133 births
1220 deaths
Anglo-Normans
People from Portsmouth